Mai Yanagida (born 1 December 1992) is a Japanese international cricketer. In April 2019, she was named as the captain of  Japan's squad for the 2019 ICC Women's Qualifier EAP tournament in Vanuatu. She made her Women's Twenty20 International (WT20I) debut for Japan against Indonesia in the Women's Qualifier EAP tournament on 6 May 2019. She also played for the national team in the 2013 ICC Women's World Twenty20 Qualifier, and was the part of her country's team at the 2014 Asian Games in Incheon, South Korea.

Born in Kanagawa, Yanagida played softball in her youth and first played cricket as a student at Waseda University.

References

Notes

External links 
 
 Mai Yanagida at CricHQ

1992 births
Living people
Japanese women cricketers
Japan women Twenty20 International cricketers
Cricketers at the 2014 Asian Games
Asian Games competitors for Japan
Sportspeople from Kanagawa Prefecture
Waseda University alumni
Japanese expatriate sportspeople in Australia